Richard Moorhead is a Professor of Law and Professional Ethics at the University of Exeter.

Prior to his appointment at Exeter, Moorhead was the first Chair of Law and Professional Ethics and Vice Dean (Research) in the Faculty of Laws at University College London (UCL). His work focuses on lawyers, their ethics, regulation and professional competence. He is the co-editor of  After Universalism: Re-Engineering Access to Justice. 

He was elected to a Fellowship in the Academy of Social Sciences in 2019.

Moorhead is also a poet whose work has been featured in periodicals.  His first pamphlet, the Reluctant Vegetarian (Oystercatcher Press) was shortlisted for the Michael Marks Award.  His second, the Word Museum is published by Flarestack Poets.

Moorhead left UCL to join the University of Exeter as its Head of Law in 2019. He stepped down from the role less than two years later, to be replaced by Professor Sue Prince.

Books
Moorhead, Richard, Steven Vaughan, and Cristina Godinho. In-house Lawyers' Ethics: Institutional Logics, Legal Risk and the Tournament of Influence. ,Oxford:Hart, 2019.  
Moorhead, Richard., ed.  After Universalism: Re-engineering Access to Justice.  Oxford: Blackwell Publ, 2003. OCLC 249031305

References

External links
 Web page at University College
 the Reluctant Vegetarian
 Michael Marks Award
 the Word Museum

Academics of University College London
Living people
Year of birth missing (living people)
Place of birth missing (living people)